Perimede catapasta is a moth in the family Cosmopterigidae. It was described by Walsingham in 1909. It is found in Mexico.

References

Natural History Museum Lepidoptera generic names catalog

Moths described in 1909
Chrysopeleiinae